Bob Pringle (born in 1942 in Queensland) was a left-wing activist and construction worker in the Builders Labourers Federation who was active in left-wing campaigns in the 1960s and 1970s in New South Wales. He helped the green bans, Aboriginal Tent Embassy and protests against the Springboks. He drowned while swimming in 1996. A wake was held in Harold Park Hotel, and his funeral service was held on August 7, 1996. He was survived by his step-daughter Jane.

References

External links 

 Collection of Pringle's papers held by the Noel Butlin Archives Centre

1942 births
1996 deaths
Australian trade unionists
Green bans